Tapli Rural Municipality is a rural municipality in Udayapur district of Province No. 1 in Nepal. There are 4 rural municipalities in Udayapur district. There are 5 wards in this municipality. According to 2011 census of Nepal, the total population of the municipality is 14,567 and total area is 119. km². The headquarter of the municipality is in Rupatar

The rural municipality was established on March 10, 2017 when Ministry of Federal Affairs and Local Development dissolved the existing village development committees and announced the establishment of this new local body.

Rupatar, Thanagaun, Iname, Okhale and Lekhgaun VDCs were merged to form the new rural municipality.

See also
 Udayapurgadhi Rural Municipality
 Rautamai Rural Municipality
 Sunkoshi Rural Municipality

References

External links
 taplimun.gov.np/

Rural municipalities in Koshi Province
Rural municipalities in Udayapur district
Rural municipalities of Nepal established in 2017